was the name of a cancelled 2.5D side-scrolling platform game in the Mega Man series that was being developed by Capcom for Xbox Live Arcade and PlayStation Network. Mainly based on Mega Man 2, the game would have allowed players to create their own levels and customize characters. It would have been the first game in the franchise to be referred to as "Mega Man" in Japan, where the franchise is known as "Rockman".

Summary
Much like the recent downloadable releases, Mega Man 9 and 10, the gameplay takes its cue from Mega Man 2, forgoing the special abilities introduced in games afterwards. However, the game is given a 2.5D look, featuring rendered level designs and CG characters. The game's base story and main campaign will be based on those of Mega Man 2. In this game, however, players have the choice to construct their own levels, or customize existing levels, using various tools to place platforms, obstacles, enemies and items. These levels can be shared online for other people to play. Players can also customize their Mega Man with exchangeable parts and special chips which gives each Mega Man unique attributes, such as jumping height, available weapons, etc. Alongside the customizable characters, the game offers several iterations of Mega Man, including one based on the North American NES box art of Mega Man, along with characters from other Capcom properties such as Ryu from Street Fighter and Arthur from Ghosts 'n Goblins. DLC was also planned.

Development
Production of the game began in March 2010. News of Mega Man Universe first appeared when Capcom registered the trademark on April 27, 2010. On July 16, 2010, a stop motion animated teaser trailer created by American production company iam8bit was released, which featured Mega Man, Ryu from Street Fighter and Arthur from Ghosts 'n Goblins.

Mega Man artist and producer Keiji Inafune stated "We wanted to preserve as much as we can of the classic 8-bit Mega Man feel, while allowing players to project their own Mega Man onto the game." The first gameplay trailers were released on September 2, 2010, and it was later revealed that the game would feature a level editor and character customization. Trailers for the game so far have featured music by cover band, The Megas. The game's development team will consist of various Capcom members who had previously worked on the first few Mega Man titles. Producer Akiko Ito stated that the game was quite early in production and was currently asking for feedback on what fans would like to see in the game.

Four months later, after the departure of Keiji Inafune, Capcom's Christian "Sven" Svensson reported that despite the continued silence on the game's development, it was not cancelled, although it had experienced some significant changes due to criticism regarding unresponsive controls and strong negative feedback regarding the game's art direction. However, on March 31, 2011, Capcom announced the game had been cancelled due to "various circumstances."

References

External links
 (Japanese)

Mega Man games
Platform games
Video games developed in Japan
Video games with 2.5D graphics
Cancelled PlayStation 3 games
Cancelled Xbox 360 games